Paterlini is an Italian surname. Notable people with the surname include:

Ermes Paterlini (born 1947), Italian footballer
Lucas Paterlini (born 1982), Argentine cricketer
Matias Paterlini (born 1977), Argentine cricketer
Thierry Paterlini (born 1975), Swiss ice hockey player

See also
Patrizia Paterlini-Bréchot, Italian biologist

Italian-language surnames